Archips asiaticus, the groundnut leafroller, is a species of moth of the family Tortricidae. It is found in Russia (Siberia), Korea, Japan and China (Heilongjiang, Jilin, Beijing, Gansu, Shandong, Jiangsu, Zhejiang, Anhui, Jiangxi, Hunan, Sichuan, Fujian).

The wingspan is about 18 mm. There are usually two to three generations per year with adults on wing from June to August. In Fujian, six generations per year have been recorded.

The larvae feed on the fruit and new leaves of Akebia quinata, Chloranthus serratus, Houttuynia cordata, Ipomoea aquatica, Malus baccata, Malus pumila, Prunus salicina, Prunus sargentii, Prunus tomentosa, Pyrus ussuriensis, Sinomenium acutum and Sorbus commixta. They have a dark green body and black head. The species overwinters in the larval stage.

References

Moths described in 1900
Archips
Moths of Asia